Holly Rachael Huddleston (born 11 October 1987) is a New Zealand former cricketer who played as a right-arm medium bowler and right-handed batter. She appeared in 36 One Day Internationals and 16 Twenty20 Internationals for New Zealand between 2014 and 2020. She played domestic cricket for Northern Districts, Auckland, Middlesex and Western Storm.

In April 2018, she won the Phyl Blackler Cup for her domestic bowling at the New Zealand Cricket Awards. In August 2018, she was awarded a central contract by New Zealand Cricket, following the tours of Ireland and England in the previous months. In October 2018, she was named in New Zealand's squad for the 2018 ICC Women's World Twenty20 tournament in the West Indies. In January 2020, she was named in New Zealand's squad for the 2020 ICC Women's T20 World Cup in Australia.

Huddleston retired from all forms of cricket in February 2023.

References

External links 
 
 

1987 births
Living people
People from Springs, Gauteng
Sportspeople from Gauteng
New Zealand women cricketers
New Zealand women One Day International cricketers
New Zealand women Twenty20 International cricketers
Northern Districts women cricketers
Auckland Hearts cricketers
Middlesex women cricketers
Western Storm cricketers